Terrance Michael Drew (born 22 November 1976) is a medical doctor and politician who is the fourth and current prime minister of Saint Kitts and Nevis, having been elected to the National Assembly in the 5 August 2022 general election. 

He graduated from the Clarence Fitzroy Bryant College in 1996. At the age of 19, he was a part time teacher at the Basseterre High School. In 1998, he went to Cuba to study medicine, and graduated from the Universidad de Ciencias Médicas de Villa Clara in Santa Clara. Drew then returned to Saint Kitts to work as a general practitioner. He later went to Texas to study internal medicine, and graduated from Texas Tech University Health Sciences Center in 2013.

He was elected as the leader of Saint Kitts and Nevis Labour Party in November 2021.

The Drew ministry was sworn in on 15 August 2022, and Drew took over the portfolio of Minister of Finance for himself.

References 

1976 births
Living people
Prime Ministers of Saint Kitts and Nevis
Finance ministers of Saint Kitts and Nevis
Saint Kitts and Nevis Labour Party politicians
Saint Kitts and Nevis physicians
Texas Tech University Health Sciences Center alumni